Matamoras may refer to:

 Matamoras, Indiana
 Matamoras, Ohio
 Matamoras, Pennsylvania

See also
Matamoros (disambiguation)